Sandra Maria Lima Suruagy (born April 17, 1963) is a retired volleyball player from Brazil, who represented her native country at the 1996 Summer Olympics in Atlanta, Georgia. There she claimed the bronze medal with the Women's National Team. She also competed at the 1984 Summer Olympics and the 1988 Summer Olympics.

References

External links
 
 

1963 births
Living people
Brazilian women's volleyball players
Olympic volleyball players of Brazil
Volleyball players at the 1984 Summer Olympics
Volleyball players at the 1988 Summer Olympics
Volleyball players at the 1996 Summer Olympics
Olympic bronze medalists for Brazil
Place of birth missing (living people)
Olympic medalists in volleyball
Medalists at the 1996 Summer Olympics
Sportspeople from Alagoas